Peter Michael Fuller (31 August 1947 – 28 April 1990) was a British art critic and magazine editor.

Life
Fuller was born in Damascus, Syria, and educated at Epsom College and Peterhouse, Cambridge. In the early 1970s he wrote for the radical newspapers Black Dwarf and Seven Days , and was responsible for establishing the latter, "a short-lived Marxist glossy weekly". Fuller subsequently freelanced elsewhere. Originally a follower of the critic John Berger, Fuller moved to the political right in mid-life, coming into conflict with his former allies Art & Language.

Peter Fuller was the founding editor of the art magazine Modern Painters, launched in 1987, reflecting his admiration for the aesthetic principles of John Ruskin. In the spring of 1989 he was appointed art critic of The Daily Telegraph. Along with such books as Art and Psychoanalysis, Fuller wrote regularly for Art Monthly UK and New Society for nearly 20 years.

Fuller died in a car accident on the M4 motorway in Berkshire on 28 April 1990. Peter Fuller is buried in Stowlangtoft, Suffolk, UK.

The archive of Fuller's letters, journals and writings is held at the Tate Gallery in London. The Peter Fuller Memorial Foundation, a registered English charity (no.1014623), was set up in 1991. The Foundation hosts an annual lecture at the Tate Gallery and runs the online art magazine Art Influence.

Books
Die Champions: Psychoanalyse d. Spitzensportlers, Frankfurt am Main: S. Fischer, 1976.
The Champions: The Secret Motives in Games and Sports, Urizen Books, 1977; London: Allen Lane, 1978
The Psychology of Gambling (with Jon Halliday), Harmondsworth: Pelican, 1977
Art and Psychoanalysis, London and New York: Writers and Readers, 1981; The Hogarth Press, 1988
Beyond the Crisis in Art - Writers and Readers;, 1981.
Robert Natkin, New York: Harry N. Abrams, Inc., 1981
Seeing Berger: A Reevaluation of Ways of Seeing, Writers & Readers, 1981
Aesthetics After Modernism, Writers and Readers, 1983.
The Naked Artis: 'Art and Biology' and Other Essays, Writers & Readers Publishing, 1983
Images of God: The Consolations of Lost Illusions, London: Chatto and Windus, 1985; London: The Hogarth Press, 1990
The Australian Scapegoat: Towards and Antipodean Aesthetic, University of Western Australia Press, Western Australia, 1986
Henry Moore, (with Susan Crompton and Richard Cork), London: Royal Academy of Arts / Weidenfeld & Nicolson, 1988
Seeing Through Berger, Claridge Press, 1988
Theoria: Art and the Absence of Grace, Chatto and Windus, 1988.
Left High and Dry: the Posturing of the Left Establishment, The Claridge Press, 1990
Marches Past, The Hogarth Press, 1991
Peter Fuller's Modern Painters: Reflections on British Art, (edited by John McDonald), London: Methuen, 1993
Henry Moore: An Interpretation, Methuen, 1994.

Films
Peter Fuller made a number of documentaries with Mike Dibb, including;
Somewhere Over the Rainbow - art and psychoanalysis with Robert Natkin and Peter Fuller, 50 minutes, BBC, 1979
Fields of Play - series exploring the role of play in every area of our lives from childhood and learning to gambling and war games, 5x60 minutes, BBC, 1979
Naturally Creative - wide-ranging film essay on the origins of human creativity, 90 minutes, Channel 4, 1986/7

References

External links
 Art Influence web-site

1947 births
1990 deaths
British art critics
People from Damascus
Road incident deaths in England
People educated at Epsom College
Alumni of Peterhouse, Cambridge
The Daily Telegraph people
20th-century English businesspeople